The following list of University of Glasgow people provides a selection of the well-known people who have studied or taught at the University of Glasgow since its inception in 1451. Historical lists of Chancellors, Rectors and Principals of the University are contained in those offices' respective articles.

Nobel laureates

 Sir Derek Barton, winner of the Nobel Prize in Chemistry
 Sir James Black, winner of the Nobel Prize in Medicine
 John Boyd Orr, 1st Baron Boyd-Orr, biologist and winner of the Nobel Peace Prize
 Sir William Ramsay, winner of the Nobel Prize in Chemistry
 Frederick Soddy, winner of the Nobel Prize in Chemistry
 Alexander R. Todd, Baron Todd, winner of the Nobel Prize in Chemistry
 Sir Robert Geoffrey Edwards, awarded the Nobel Prize in Physiology or Medicine
 David MacMillan, awarded the Nobel Prize in Chemistry

Arts
 Sir Drummond Bone, Byron scholar and Master of Balliol College, Oxford
 Hannah Frank, artist and sculptor
 Richard Claverhouse Jebb, classical scholar and politician
 Alexander Stoddart, Her Majesty's Sculptor in Ordinary for Scotland
 Peter Mullan,  actor and filmmaker
 Alison Yarrington, art historian

History
 John Bannerman, historian, noted for his work on Gaelic Scotland
 Robert Browning, Byzantinist
 D. B. Campbell, ancient historian
 Lewis Campbell, classical scholar
 Sir James Frazer, author of The Golden Bough; a founder of the field of anthropology
 Gilbert Highet, classicist and literary historian
 Sir William Wilson Hunter, K.C.S.I., historian, Indologist
 Sir Richard Lodge, historian
 John Duncan Mackie,  Scottish historian
 F. Marian McNeill, social historian and author of The Silver Bough
 Charlotte Methuen, church and Reformation historian 
 William Young Sellar, classical scholar
 Hew Strachan, historian
 Bernard Wasserstein, historian

Musicians
 Paul Buchanan, Robert Bell and Paul Joseph Moore of The Blue Nile
 Neil Clark, Lloyd Cole, Blair Cowan, Lawrence Donegan and Stephen Irvine of Lloyd Cole and the Commotions
 Isaac Hirshow, cantor and composer
 Sydney MacEwan, tenor, singer of Scottish and Irish traditional songs
 Stuart Murdoch, musician and songwriter; principal member of Belle & Sebastian
 Simon Neil, lead vocalist, guitarist and principal songwriter of Biffy Clyro
 Dr Albert Lister Peace, the university's organist between 1870 and 1880
 Emeli Sandé, R&B, soul and breakbeat singer/songwriter
 Ramesh Srivastava, musician and songwriter; principal member of Voxtrot

Philosophy and theology
 John Abernethy, Irish Presbyterian leader
 David Stow Adam, theologian
 William Adam, Baptist minister, missionary, abolitionist
 William Menzies Alexander, medical and theological writer
 John Anderson, Scottish-Australian philosopher, founded the empirical brand of philosophy known as Australian realism
 Alexander Bain, philosopher
 William Barclay, theologian
 David Beaton, cardinal and Archbishop of St. Andrews
 James Beaton, Archbishop of Glasgow and St. Andrews, Primate of Scotland
 Zachary Boyd, theologian
 John Caird, theologian and preacher, Principal and Vice-Chancellor of the University of Glasgow (1873–98)
 Alexander Campbell, co-founder of the Restoration Movement
 Neil Campbell, minister, Principal of the University of Glasgow (1727 to 1761)
 Tom Campbell, philosopher and jurist
 Semyon Desnitsky, legal scholar, professor of the Moscow University
 William Elphinstone, statesman and bishop, founder of the University of Aberdeen
 William Hugh Clifford Frend, early church historian
 Francis Hutcheson, philosopher
 David Jasper, leader in study of literature and theology
 John Knox, religious reformer and theologian
Kung Lap-yan, a Hong Kong public theologian
 Cosmo Lang, Archbishop of Canterbury
 David Livingstone, missionary
 John Macquarrie, leading 20th century theologian and Professor of Divinity at Union Theological Seminary (NY) and Oxford
 William McIntyre, minister and educator
 Andrew Melville, theologian and religious reformer
 George Newlands, theologian
 Thomas Reid, philosopher
 Adam Smith, economist and philosopher
 Dugald Stewart, philosopher
 Archibald Campbell Tait, Archbishop of Canterbury
 R Guy Ramsay, Baptist minister and President of the Baptist Union of Scotland, 1948–49
 Daniel Sandford, Bishop of Tasmania
 Patrick Forbes, Chancellor of Aberdeen University and Bishop of Aberdeen
 Alexander Peden,  one of the leading figures in the Covenanter movement in Scotland.

Writers and poets

 Lin Anderson, writer
 Julie Bertagna, writer
 James Boswell, writer
 William Boyd, writer
 James Bridie (Osborne Henry Mavor), dramatist and founder of the Glasgow Citizens' Theatre
 Christopher Brookmyre, writer
 Luke Brown, writer
 John Buchan, 1st Baron Tweedsmuir, writer and Governor General of Canada
 Robert Williams Buchanan, poet
 C. Delisle Burns, atheist and secularist writer and lecturer
 Thomas Campbell, poet
 Robert Crawford, poet, Professor of English at the University of St Andrews
 A. J. Cronin, physician and writer who's given credit for inspiring the National Health Service
 Ann Marie Di Mambro, playwright and scriptwriter
 Hal Duncan, writer
 Jane Duncan (Elizabeth Jane Cameron), writer
 Dimitra Fimi, writer and academic
 Fraser Frisell, friend of Chateaubriand
 Janice Galloway, writer
 Robert Cunninghame Graham of Gartmore, poet and politician
 Alasdair Gray, writer and artist
 David Gray, poet
 Janice Hally, playwright and scriptwriter
 Robert Henryson, poet (probably taught)
 James Herriot, writer
 Philip Hobsbaum, poet and critic
 John Jamieson, lexicographer
 James Kelman, writer
 Walter Kennedy, poet
 Tom Leonard, poet and essayist
 Liz Lochhead, poet and dramatist
 Helen MacInnes, "queen of spy writers"
 Alistair MacLean, writer
 Ken MacLeod, writer
 Alasdair MacMhaighstir Alasdair, Gaelic bard and Jacobite captain
 Aonghas MacNeacail, Gaelic poet
 Laura Marney, writer
 Angus Matheson (1912–1962), inaugural Professor of Celtic at the University of Glasgow
 William McIllvanney, writer
 Caroline Moir, writer 
 Edwin Morgan, poet
 Seamus Perry, academic and writer
 Robert William Service, poet and writer
 Jane Shaw, writer
 J David Simons, writer
 Sir John Sinclair, 1st Baronet, writer and the first person to use the word "statistics" in the English language
 Tobias Smollett, writer
 Derick Thomson, Gaelic writer and academic
 Alexander Trocchi, writer
 John Wilson, writer
 Thomas Hamilton, Among the 'Glasgow School' of early nineteenth century Scottish novelists
 Archibald Alison, Scottish episcopalian priest and essayist
 Sir Daniel Keyte Sandford, Scottish politician and Greek scholar
 Alexander Carlyle, church leader, and autobiographer.

Business

 James Blyth, Baron Blyth of Rowington, Chairman of Diageo
 Keith Cochrane, Chief Executive of Weir Group
 Douglas Flint, Chairman of HSBC
 Alexander Fleck, 1st Baron Fleck, FRS, KBE, and chairman of ICI
 Fred Goodwin, former Chief Executive of the Royal Bank of Scotland Group
 Hugh Grant, Chief Executive of the Monsanto Company, St. Louis, Missouri, US
 David MacBrayne, founder of the shipping company that later became Caledonian MacBrayne, now David MacBrayne, Ltd.
 James McGill, Scottish-Canadian fur-trader and philanthropist, endowed McGill University
 Tom McKillop, former Chairman of the Royal Bank of Scotland Group
 David Nish, Chief Executive of Standard Life plc

Civil service

 Sir Fazle Hasan Abed, founder of world's largest NGO, BRAC
 Mushtaq Ahmad, Lord Lieutenant of Lanarkshire
 David Bell, Vice-Chancellor of the University of Reading, previously Permanent Secretary of the Department for Education
 Henry Beveridge, famous orientalist and member of Indian Civil Service joined in 1857; elected president of The Asiatic Society of Bengal (1890-91).
 James Bonar, civil servant, political economist and historian of economic thought
 John Cairncross, in 1936, scored double first (domestic & foreign service) in Civil Service exam, alleged to be one of the Cambridge Five
 Sir Matthew Campbell, Secretary of the Department of Agriculture and Fisheries for Scotland
 Sir Oliver Franks, influential civil servant in postwar Britain
 Sir Bill Jeffrey, Permanent Secretary at the Ministry of Defence
Paul Johnston, British diplomat
 Ken McCallum, Director General of MI5
 Francis J. Meehan, 1924-2022, American diplomat involved in events depicted in the 2015 Steven Spielberg, film "Bridge of Spies"
 Sir Muir Russell, Permanent Secretary to the Scottish Executive
 Francis Richard John Sandford, 1st Baron Sandford, instrumental in implementing the Elementary Education Act of 1870.

Law

 Joseph Beltrami, Glasgow defence lawyer who secured the first Royal Pardon issued in Scotland
 Sir David King Murray, Lord Birnam (1884–1955), Solicitor-General for Scotland, Senator of the College of Justice
 Harald Leslie, Lord Birsay, Chairman of the Scottish Land Court
 Iain Bonomy, Lord Bonomy, Senator of the College of Justice and Judge of the International Criminal Tribunal for the former Yugoslavia
 James Boyle, legal academic, William Neal Reynolds Professor of Law at Duke University School of Law
 James Chadwin QC, barrister who represented Peter Sutcliffe (the "Yorkshire Ripper")
 Matthew Clarke, Lord Clarke, Senator of the College of Justice
 Hazel Cosgrove, Lady Cosgrove, first woman judge in Court of Session
 James Dalrymple, 1st Viscount of Stair, 17th century Scottish jurist
 Charles Dickson, Lord Dickson, Lord Advocate and Lord President of the Court of Session
 George Emslie, Lord Emslie, Lord President of the Court of Session
 Henry Erskine, former Lord Advocate
 Brian Gill, Lord Gill, Lord Justice Clerk
 John Inglis, Lord Glencorse, former Lord Advocate and Lord President of the Court of Session, and former Rector of the University
 Thomas Miller, Lord Glenlee, former Lord Advocate and Lord President of the Court of Session, and former Rector of the University
 Arthur Hamilton, Lord Hamilton, Lord President of the Court of Session
 Ian Hamilton, advocate, Scottish Nationalist
 Lord Irvine of Lairg, former Lord Chancellor
 Douglas Jamieson, Lord Jamieson, former Lord Advocate and Senator of the College of Justice
 Lord Jauncey of Tullichettle, Lord of Appeal in Ordinary
 Francis Jeffrey, Lord Jeffrey, Senator of the College of Justice and literary critic
 Robert Malcolm Kerr, Judge of the Guildhall Court in the City of London for 43 years
 Sir Neil MacCormick, Regius Professor of Public Law and the Law of Nature and Nations, University of Edinburgh
 Hugh Macmillan, Baron Macmillan, former Lord Advocate and Lord of Appeal in Ordinary
 Alexander Munro MacRobert, former Lord Advocate
 Professor Gerry Maher, Professor of Criminal Law at the University of Edinburgh, former Law Commissioner
 Hugh Matthews, Lord Matthews, Senator of the College of Justice
 Robin McEwan, Lord McEwan, Senator of the College of Justice
 William Rankine Milligan, Lord Milligan, former Lord Advocate and Senator of the College of Justice
 David Murray (1842–1928), Glasgow solicitor, antiquarian, book-collector, and legal scholar
 Ann Paton, Lady Paton, Senator of the College of Justice
 Ralph Risk (1891–1961), solicitor, lawyer, president of the Law Society of Scotland and senior partner in Maclay Murray & Spens
 Lord Roger of Earlsferry, Lord of Appeal in Ordinary
 Alexander Ure, 1st Baron Strathclyde, former Lord Advocate and Lord President of the Court of Session
 Alan Watson, Civil Law scholar (former Douglas Professor of Civil Law)
 John Wheatley, Baron Wheatley, former Lord Advocate and Lord Justice Clerk, established Scottish Legal Aid system
 Lord Wilson of Langside, former Lord Advocate and Senator of the College of Justice
 Norman Wylie, Lord Wylie, former Lord Advocate and Senator of the College of Justice
 Robert Hodshon Cay, Judge Admiral of Scotland overseeing naval trials and maternal grandfather of James Clerk Maxwell.
 Sir John Clerk, 2nd Baronet, politician, lawyer, judge and composer.

Media

 Ruaridh Arrow, documentary filmmaker
 Raman Bhardwaj, sports broadcaster, STV News 
 Gerard Butler, actor 
 Susan Calman, comedian and panellist
 Glenn Campbell, Scottish news and current affairs broadcaster
 Andrew Cotter, sports broadcaster
 John Grierson, filmmaker, "father of the documentary film"
 Duncan Hamilton, columnist for The Scotsman
 Eileen Hayes, author, broadcaster and columnist
 Greg Hemphill, comedian, performer, actor, half of the team in "Still Game"
 Ford Kiernan, comedian, performer, second half of the team in "Still Game"
 Iain Martin, political commentator, former editor of The Scotsman
 John MacKay, STV News journalist, main anchor
 Anne MacKenzie, television presenter and news anchorwoman
 Robin McKie, science editor, The Observer
 Hugh Dan MacLennan, sporting academic and broadcaster
 Ian McCaskill, weatherman
 Tom Morton, journalist and broadcaster
 Shereen Nanjiani, Scottish journalist
 Hamad Nazzal, journalist
 Andrew Neil, journalist and broadcaster
 Fraser Nelson, editor of The Spectator
 Neil Oliver, archaeologist, historian, author and broadcaster
 David Paisley, actor 
 Shantha Roberts, artist and TV presenter
 Sarah Smith, news presenter

Military

 General Sir Archibald Alison, 2nd Baronet, Scottish soldier who achieved high office
 Lieutenant Robert Blair, received the Victoria Cross
 Lieutenant-General Sir Robert Boyd, British Army officer and Governor of Gibraltar
 Captain Lord Archibald Hamilton, Lord of the Admiralty
 General William Cathcart, 1st Earl Cathcart, Commander-in-Chief of Scotland and Ambassador to Russia during the Great Patriotic War of 1812
 Lieutenant Colonel James Hamilton, Commandant of the Scots Greys at the Battle of Waterloo
 Colonel William Hamilton, 2nd Duke of Hamilton, Royalist Commander during the Wars of the Three Kingdoms
 Lieutenant General Sir David Henderson,  commander of the Royal Flying Corps and instrumental in establishing the Royal Air Force
 Archibald Campbell, 9th Earl of Argyll, Hereditary chief of Clan Campbell, and a Royalist supporter during the latter stages of the Scottish Civil War and its aftermath.
 Lieutenant General James Hamilton, 4th Duke of Hamilton and 1st Duke of Brandon, major investor in the failed Darien Scheme and British ambassador to Louis XIV of France 
 Major General David Tennant Cowan CB, CBE, DSO & Bar, MC. Distinguished for leading the Indian 17th Infantry Division during almost the entire Burma Campaign.
Major-general Sir Thomas Munro, 1st Baronet KCB. East India Company Army officer and statesman.
Colonel James Lennox Dawson VC. Recipient of the Victoria Cross
Donald MacKintosh (VC). Recipient of the Victoria Cross
Harry Ranken. Recipient of the Victoria Cross
Sir John Snell. Royalist Soldier in the English Civil War. Founded the Snell Exhibition.
Archibald Campbell Fraser of Lovat, 20th MacShimidh (chief) of Clan Fraser of Lovat.
General Simon Fraser of Lovat, the 19th Chief of the Clan Fraser of Lovat.
Air Marshal Stuart Atha, senior officer of the Royal Air Force.
Wing Commander Hector Maclean,  Battle of Britain fighter pilot.

Politics

 John Crowley, Irish Sinn Féin politician and medical practitioner
 John Maclean, leading figure of the Red Clydeside era
 James Maxton, leader of the Independent Labour Party
 Archibald Campbell, 3rd Duke of Argyll,  dominant political leader in Scotland in the 18th century. 
 William Lamb, 2nd Viscount Melbourne, Queen Victoria's first Prime Minister 
 James Allison Glen,  Canadian parliamentarian and Speaker of the Canadian House of Commons
 James Douglas, 2nd Duke of Queensberry, last Lord High Commissioner before the Act of Union 
 James Maitland, 8th Earl of Lauderdale,  Keeper of the Great Seal of Scotland and a representative peer for Scotland in the House of Lords.

Conservative Party

 Eric Forth, MP
 Liam Fox, MP
 Tam Galbraith, long-time MP for Glasgow Hillhead whose death in 1982 led to the historic election of Roy Jenkins and formation of the new Social Democratic Party (UK)
 James Gray, MP
 John Lamont, MP for Berwickshire, Roxburgh and Selkirk
 Bonar Law, Conservative Prime Minister
 Mark Menzies, MP
 Sir Teddy Taylor, MP
 Sir David Robertson, MP

Labour Party
 
 Wendy Alexander, MSP
 John Baird, MP for Wolverhampton 1945-64
 Sarah Boyack, MSP
 Des Browne QC, Secretary of State for Defence
 Margaret Curran, MSP
 Donald Dewar, former First Minister of Scotland
 Andrew Faulds, MP
 Sam Galbraith, former Minister (UK Government)
 Jim Gallagher, Head of Justice Department for the Scottish Executive
 Derry Irvine, Baron Irvine of Lairg QC, former Lord Chancellor
 Thomas Johnston, former Secretary of State for Scotland
 Johann Lamont, MSP
 Anne McGuire, MP
 Bridget Prentice, MP
 Gordon Prentice, MP
 William Ross, Baron Ross of Marnock, former Secretary of State for Scotland
 John Smith, former Labour party leader and UK Cabinet Minister
 Paul Sweeney, MSP
 John Wheatley, Lord Wheatley; politician, lawyer and Judge of the Court of Session
 Tony Worthington, MP
 Hector McNeil, Secretary of State for Scotland
Tom Johnston, Secretary of State for Scotland
Willie Ross, Baron Ross of Marnock, Secretary of State for Scotland

Liberal Party/Liberal Democrats

 Elspeth Attwooll, former MEP for the Liberal Democrats
 John Bannerman, Baron Bannerman of Kildonan
 James Bryce, 1st Viscount Bryce, Regius Professor of Civil Law at Oxford, Liberal politician, British ambassador to the US in 1907-13
 Sir Vince Cable, former leader of the Liberal Democrats
 Sir Menzies Campbell, former leader of the Liberal Democrats
 Sir Henry Campbell-Bannerman, Liberal Party Prime Minister
 Alistair Carmichael, MP for Orkney and Shetland
 Charles Kennedy, former leader of the Liberal Democrats
 Sir William Sutherland, Chancellor of the Duchy of Lancaster, 1922
 Alan Reid, former Liberal Democrat Member of Parliament for Argyll and Bute

Scottish National Party

 Alasdair Allan, MSP for Na h-Eileanan an Iar
 Marco Biagi, MSP for Edinburgh Central
 Mhairi Black, MP for Paisley and Renfrewshire South
 Aileen Campbell, MSP, youngest MSP in the 2007 - 2011 Session
 Angela Constance, MSP
 Annabelle Ewing, former MP
 Fergus Ewing, MSP
 Margaret Ewing, MSP, former MP
 Winnie Ewing, former SNP President, former MP, MSP and MEP
 Linda Fabiani, MSP Minister for Europe, External Affairs and Culture
 Ian Hamilton, repatriator of the Stone of Destiny and Queen's Counsel
 Jamie Hepburn, MSP
 Fiona Hyslop, Cabinet Secretary for Culture, Tourism and External Affairs
 John MacCormick, founder of the National Party of Scotland
 Neil MacCormick, MEP
 Derek Mackay, MSP (did not graduate)
 Jim Mather, MSP Minister for Enterprise, Energy and Tourism
 Alasdair Morgan, MSP Deputy Presiding Officer
 Shona Robison, MSP
 Nicola Sturgeon, first Minister of Scotland, SNP Leader, MSP
 Andrew Welsh, MSP, former MP

Scottish Unionist Party
 Walter Elliot, former Scottish Secretary
 Robert Horne, 1st Viscount Horne of Slamannan, Chancellor of the Exchequer
 Albert Russell, Scottish Unionist Party member and MP

Miscellaneous
 Charles Allan Cathcart, former MP and British Ambassador to China
 William Steel Dickson, radical Ulster Presbyterian and Irish republican revolutionary, member of the United Irishmen
 Regina Ip, first woman to be appointed as Secretary for Security of Hong Kong
 Nasharudin Mat Isa, Member of the Parliament of Malaysia; Deputy President of the opposition PAS
 Yanis Varoufakis, Greek Minister of Finance from January to July 2015

Sciences

Medical
 Gavin Arneil, paediatric nephrologist
 John Bell, 18th-century adviser to the Tsar and author of a travelogue from St. Petersburg to Beijing
 Robert Broom, physician
 Sir Harry Burns, Chief Medical Officer for Scotland
 Sir Kenneth Calman, Scottish cancer researcher, former Chief Medical Officer, current Chancellor of the University of Glasgow
 Murdoch Cameron, Regius Professor of Midwifery; performed first modern Caesarian section in 1888; father of Samuel James Cameron
 Maud Perry Menzies, community health physician; RAMC captain during World War II
 Hani Gabra, professor of Oncology at Imperial College London
 Samuel James Cameron, Regius Professor of Midwifery; son of Murdoch Cameron; collector of Scottish art
 Stuart Campbell, obstetrician and gynaecologist
 William Cullen, physician, chemist, agriculturalist, professor at Edinburgh Medical School
 Ian Donald, pioneer of diagnostic and obstetric medical ultrasound
 Ian Hart, neurologist
 John Hunter, surgeon
 William Hunter, anatomist and physician
 James Jameson, surgeon general, Army Medical Service
 Bryan J. Jennett, with Sir Graham Teasdale, co-inventor of the Glasgow Coma Scale
 R. D. Laing, psychiatrist
 Sir Alan Langlands, former chief executive of the NHS, vice-chancellor of the University of Leeds
 William Boog Leishman, pathologist credited with first successful anti-typhoid inoculation
 Joseph Lister, surgeon
 David Livingstone, "Dr. Livingstone," 19th century medical missionary to Africa (didn't graduate)
 Donald MacAlister, also Principal of the University of Glasgow, 1907–29
 Sir William Macewen, pioneer of neurosurgery
 Elizabeth Janet MacGregor, medical doctor and cancer researcher
 Dame Louise McIlroy, obstetrics and gynaecology consultant; first woman to receive M.D. from the University
 Quintin McKellar, veterinary surgeon and vice-chancellor of the University of Hertfordshire
 Janet Niven, histologist and pathologist
 Priscilla Nzimiro, physician
 Delphine Parrott, endocrinologist and immunologist, Gardiner Professor of Immunology 1980-1990
 David Shannon (gynaecologist), physician, academic, World War I medical officer, foundation fellow of the Royal College of Obstetricians and Gynaecologists
 James McCune Smith, first university trained African-American physician; abolitionist and public intellectual in New York
Alexander Stewart-Wilson, foundation fellow of the Royal College of Obstetricians and Gynaecologists
John Hammond Teacher,  pathologist, researcher and medical academic
 Sir Graham Teasdale, with Bryan J. Jennett, co-inventor of the Glasgow Coma Scale
 Thomas Thomson (botanist), Scottish surgeon with the British East India Company 
 Robert Thomson,a pioneer of sanitation
 Donald James MacKintosh, Scottish physician, soldier and public health expert.
 Sir Gilbert Blane, Scottish physician who instituted health reform in the Royal Navy.
 John Moore, Scottish physician and travel author.
 Edward Provan Cathcart,  Regius Professor of Physiology at the University of Glasgow
Mujibur Rahman, Medical scientist, recipient of Ekushey Padak.
Merbai Ardesir Vakil, physician, first Asian woman to graduate from a Scottish university

Biology

 Sir John Arbuthnott, Scottish microbiologist, and Principal of the University of Strathclyde (1991-2000)
David Douglas, botanist
Alan Gemmell, Professor of Biology, Keele University 1950-77
Robert Thomson Leiper, parasitologist and helminthologist
Sheina Marshall, marine biologist
Muriel Robertson, protozoologist and bacteriologist at the Lister Institute
 Sir William Jackson Hooker, Regius Professor of Botany and Director of the Royal Botanic Gardens, Kew.
Thomas Hopkirk, botanist and lithographer.
John Hutton Balfour, Professor of Botany also becoming Regius Keeper of the Royal Botanic Garden Edinburgh and Her Majesty's Botanist.
Isaac Bayley Balfour, Regius Professor of Botany and Sherardian Professor of Botany Oxford.
John Hope, Scottish physician and botanist. Best known as an early supporter of Carl Linnaeus's system of classification.
David Campbell, Professor of Materia Medica at Aberdeen University from 1930 to 1959. Won the Military Cross in 1918 due to his bravery serving in the Royal Army Medical Corps.
Heather M. Ferguson, FRSE Professor Professor of Medical Entomology and Disease Ecology, co-chairs the WHO Vector Control Advisory Group on malaria
Guido Pontecorvo,  the University's first Professor of Genetics
Malcolm Ferguson-Smith, one of the first geneticists to provide a diagnostic and counselling service to patients with genetic conditions.
Anne Ferguson-Smith, Arthur Balfour Professor of Genetics.
Percy Wragg Brian, Regius Professor of Botany.

Chemistry
 Thomas Andrews, chemist and physicist, received the Royal Medal in 1844 for his work on the heat developed in chemical actions
 Joseph Black, physicist and chemist
 Leroy (Lee) Cronin, chemist
 Thomas Graham, chemist
 George William Gray, chemist, pioneer of stable liquid crystals, awarded Kyoto Prize and Leverhulme Medal
 Jōkichi Takamine, chemist
 Alexander Todd, Baron Todd, chemist
 Thomas Thomson, Regius Professor of Chemistry, gave silicon its name
 Thomas Charles Hope, proved the existence of the element strontium, and gave his name to Hope's experiment

Mathematics, physical sciences and engineering

 John Anderson, natural philosopher and founder of the Anderson's Institution in 1796 (predecessor to the University of Strathclyde)
 John Logie Baird, inventor of television
 Frank Barnwell, aeronautical engineer and pilot of first powered flight in Scotland in 1909
 Bruce C. Berndt, mathematician
 John Brown, Astronomer Royal for Scotland
 A. Catrina Bryce, physicist, electrical engineer
 Jocelyn Bell Burnell, astrophysicist
 Ethel Currie, geologist
 Henry Dyer, engineer
 William Gemmell Cochran, statistician
 Bernard Parker Haigh, engineer
 Sam Karunaratne, electrical engineer and Sri Lankan academic
 John Kerr, physicist
 Colin Maclaurin, mathematician
 Bill Napier, astronomer and novelist
 Raymond Ogden, engineering mathematician
 Percy Sinclair Pilcher, pioneer of powered flight
 Robert Alexander Rankin, mathematician
 William John Macquorn Rankine, engineer and physicist
Dorothy Rowntree the first woman graduate in engineering from the University and the first woman graduate in naval architecture in UK
 John Scott Russell, naval engineer
 Robert Simson, mathematician
 Ian Sneddon, mathematician
 William Thomson, 1st Baron Kelvin, mathematical physicist
 Gavin Vernon, engineer, known for removing the Stone of Scone from Westminster Abbey
 James Watt, mathematician and engineer
 John Robison, physicist and mathematician. Inventor of the siren.
 Hugh Blackburn, a member of the Cambridge Apostles, inventor of the Blackburn pendulum.
Gillian Wright, astronomer and director of the UK Astronomy Technology Centre

Computing

 Simon Peyton Jones, research in functional programming languages
 Philip Wadler, research in functional programming languages

Social sciences

 Sally Baldwin, social policy researcher
 Sir Alexander Cairncross, economist and Chancellor of the University of Glasgow (1972–96), 
 Sir James Frazer, social anthropologist
 Donald Kaberuka, President of the African Development Bank
 Sir Anton Muscatelli, economist and University Vice-Chancellor
 Alexander Nove, Soviet economic historian
Alison Phipps (refugee researcher) UNESCO chair in Refugee Integration through Languages and the Arts
 Ljubo Sirc, economist, author and Slovenian dissident during the Titoist regime

Sports

 John Beattie, rugby union international player
 Jim Craig, Celtic F.C. player, member of the Lisbon Lions
 Katherine Grainger, rower and Great Britain's most decorated female Olympian
 Louis Greig, rugby union player and naval surgeon
 RC Hamilton, Rangers F.C. player
 Thomas Hart, cricket and rugby union player
 Laura Muir, British record holder over 1500m and Olympic silver medalist
 Euan Murray, rugby union player for British and Irish Lions
 James Reid-Kerr, rugby union and cricket international player
 Emma Richards, yachtswoman, became the first British woman and youngest ever person to complete the single-handed round the world yacht race with stops
 David Robertson, golfer, won bronze at the 1900 Olympic Games
 Arthur Smith, rugby union player, captained Scotland and the British and Irish Lions
 Imogen Walsh, rower, 2011 lightweight women's quad World Champion
 Andrew Watson, early Scotland international footballer and first black international player in the history of the game
 Dave MacLeod, Scottish rock climber

References

See also
 University of Glasgow Memorial Gates
 List of Professorships at the University of Glasgow

 
University
Glasgow